Gyeongjong or Kyŏngjong may refer to:

Gyeongjong of Joseon, r. 1720–1724, Korean ruler
Gyeongjong of Goryeo, r. 976–981, Korean ruler

Temple name disambiguation pages